The 2012 Nagoya Grampus season is Nagoya Grampus's 20th season in the J.League Division 1 and 29th overall in the Japanese top flight. They are also competing in the 2012 J.League Cup, 2012 Emperor's Cup, and the 2012 AFC Champions League.

Players

Current squad
As of March 6, 2012

Out on loan

Transfers

Winter

In:

Out:

Summer

In:

Out:

Competitions

J.League

Results summary

Results by round

Results

League table

J.League Cup

Emperor's Cup

AFC Champions League

Group stage

Knockout stage

Squad statistics

Appearances and goals

|-
|colspan="14"|Players who appeared for Nagoya Grampus no longer at the club:
|}

Goal Scorers

Disciplinary record

References
2011 J.League Division 1 Fixture

Nagoya Grampus
Nagoya Grampus seasons